"Dynamite" is a single by Dutch DJ Afrojack, featuring American rapper Snoop Dogg. It was released on April 17, 2014, as the third single from Forget the World (2014). Released on Island Records, "Dynamite" is the fourth track to be released from the album after "As Your Friend" featuring Chris Brown, "The Spark" featuring Spree Wilson and "Ten Feet Tall" featuring Wrabel.

Charts

References

2014 songs
Afrojack songs
Songs written by Polow da Don
Songs written by Snoop Dogg
Island Records singles
2014 singles
Songs written by Afrojack
Songs written by DJ Buddha
Song recordings produced by DJ Buddha